The Impact World Tag Team Championship (formally known as the TNA World Tag Team Championship) is a professional wrestling world tag team championship which is owned by the Impact Wrestling promotion. The current champions are Bullet Club (Ace Austin and Chris Bey), who are in their first reign as a team.

It was created and debuted on May 14, 2007 at the taping of then-TNA's primary television program, TNA Impact!. It was officially introduced worldwide on the May 17, 2007 edition of TNA's online podcast TNA Today. Like most professional wrestling championships, the title is won as a result of a pre-determined match.

History

The Total Nonstop Action Wrestling promotion formed in May 2002. Later that same year, TNA were granted control over the NWA World Heavyweight and World Tag Team Championships by the National Wrestling Alliance (NWA) governing body, subsequently becoming an official NWA territory as NWA–TNA. On June 19, 2002, NWA–TNA held its first show: a weekly pay-per-view (PPV) event. The main event of the telecast was a twenty–man Gauntlet for the Gold match—involving all twenty men trying to throw each other over the top rope and down to the floor in order to eliminate them, until there are two men left who wrestle a standard match—to become the first ever TNA–era NWA World Heavyweight Champion. Ken Shamrock defeated Malice to win the vacant championship with Ricky Steamboat as Special Guest Referee at the event. TNA crowned the first TNA–era NWA World Tag Team Champions at their third weekly PPV event on July 3, 2002, when the team of A.J. Styles and Jerry Lynn defeated The Rainbow Express (Bruce and Lenny Lane) in a tournament final to win the championship.

Creation
The NWA World Heavyweight and World Tag Team Championships were contested for in TNA until the morning of May 13, 2007. On that day, NWA's Executive Director Robert Trobich announced that the NWA were ending their five–year agreement with TNA, which had allowed them full control over both titles. Trobich went on to state that effective that morning, then-NWA World Heavyweight Champion Christian Cage and the Team 3D pairing of Brother Devon and Brother Ray, then-NWA World Tag Team Champions, were stripped of their respective championships. The motivation behind these actions was that Cage refused to defend the NWA World Heavyweight Championship against wrestlers from NWA territories. That same day, TNA were scheduled to produce their Sacrifice 2007 PPV event, in which both Cage and Team 3D were to defend their respective championships. On the card, Cage was scheduled to defend the NWA World Heavyweight Championship against Kurt Angle and Sting in a three-way match. Team 3D were set to defend the NWA World Tag Team Championship against the team of Scott Steiner and Tomko and the team made up of Hernandez and Homicide, who were known as The Latin American Xchange (LAX), in another three-way match.

That night before each contest, the on-screen graphic used to refer to the champions and their respective championships, credited both Cage and Team 3D as still being NWA Champions. Team 3D defeated Steiner and Tomko and LAX in the three-way tag team match to retain the "World Tag Team Championship", while Angle defeated Cage and Sting to win the "World Heavyweight Championship".

On May 17, 2007, Jeremy Borash and TNA's primary authority figure at the time, Jim Cornette, unveiled the TNA World Tag Team Championship belt on that day's edition of TNA's online podcast TNA Today and awarded it to Team 3D as a result of them being the NWA Tag Team Champions before the NWA/TNA split; in the process making them the first official champions.

Belt designs

During the championship's entire history, it has had three designs. Until Destination X (2017), it had a leather strap covered with four small gold plates that has an imprint of the earth centered in the middle with TNA's official logo at the top of each. The center golden plate of the belt also has an imprint of a globe, with TNA's official logo engraved over it. The words "World Tag Team" are placed above the globe, while the words "Wrestling Champion" are placed below it.

At Destination X 2017, a recoloured version of the GFW Tag Team Championships from the original promotion was revealed as the new tag team championships. The main plate had the Global Force Wrestling logo to the left and the words "Tag Team Champions" centered on the bottom of the belt. The top of the main plate had a globe, with a bird below it. The sideplates had the words "Tag Team" on the top and "Champions" on the bottom, with the GFW Impact! logo on the left sideplate and the GFW logo on the right sideplate. After Jeff Jarrett left the company and took the GFW name with him, all championships have been updated with an Impact Wrestling logo to cover the GFW logo.

At Redemption on April 22, 2018, Impact revealed new championships. The main plate is oblong, similar to the WCW World Six-Man Tag Team Championship. It has the Impact logo at a diagonal angle centered between the words "Tag Team" on the top and "Champion" on the bottom. It features two designs of an owl above and below the words.

Championship Tournament(s)

TNA World Tag Team Championship Tournament (2015)
Between March 14 and March 16, 2015 episodes of Impact Wrestling a tournament was held to crown new TNA World Tag Team Champions.

Reigns

The inaugural champions were Team 3D (Brother Devon and Brother Ray), who were awarded the championship on the May 17, 2007 edition of TNA Today. At  days, The North's (Ethan Page and Josh Alexander) reign is the longest in the title's history. Eric Young/Super Eric and Kaz's only reign holds the record for shortest reign in the title's history at a half day.

Individually, James Storm holds the record with seven reigns, while Beer Money and The Wolves (Davey Richards and Eddie Edwards) share the record of five reigns as a team.

Although the title is a World Tag Team Championship, three wrestlers have held the championship by themselves — Samoa Joe, Kurt Angle, and Matt Morgan. Joe held the championship during his entire reign alone; however, Angle held the championship alone for 15 days until Sting won a match involving three other competitors to become Angle's partner, and Morgan held the title after turning on and (kayfabe) injuring his tag team championship partner Hernandez. Overall, there have been 65 reigns shared between 67 wrestlers and 43 teams.

The current champions are Bullet Club (Ace Austin and Chris Bey) who are in their first reign both as a team and individually. They defeated The Motor City Machine Guns (Alex Shelley and Chris Sabin) on February 25, 2023 in Sunrise Manor, Nevada during the Impact tapings to win the titles (aired March 2).

See also
NWA World Tag Team Championship
List of NWA World Tag Team Champions
History of Total Nonstop Action Wrestling

References

External links
Impact Wrestling World Tag Team Championships at Cagematch.com

Impact Wrestling championships
Tag team wrestling championships
2007 in professional wrestling